The East Indonesia Mujahideen (abbreviated MIT) was an Islamist militant group operating out of Poso, Sulawesi in Indonesia. The group was led by Abu Wardah (also known as Santoso) until he was killed by Indonesian police on 18 July 2016. After the death of Santoso, the group was led by Ali Kalora until he was killed on 18 September 2021. The group has pledged allegiance to the Islamic State.

MIT was proscribed by the United Nations Security Council under the Al-Qaeda Sanctions Committee on 29 September 2015. The US Department of State has designated MIT as a terrorist organisation.

MIT has largely carried out its operations within Sulawesi but has threatened to attack targets across Indonesia. The group's operations have typically avoided operations that would cause civilian casualties, but was reportedly involved in clashes between Muslims and Christians in Maluku province between 1999 and 2002.

History 
The group was founded in 2010 by Santoso in Central Sulawesi area. The group was closely affiliated with West Indonesia Mujahideen that is led by Abu Roban. Abu Roban was later killed in 2013 during a police raid in Central Java.

In 2012, Santoso was chosen to be the leader of the group. Santoso was killed by Indonesian forces in 2016. His successor, Ali Kalora, was killed on 18 September 2021 alongside another militant by Indonesian security personnel in a forest near the village of Astina, located in the Parigi Moutong Regency of Central Sulawesi.

On 29 September 2022 last member of East Indonesia Mujahideen is killed by Detachment 88. Even though all of its members have been killed or arrested, the Madago Raya operation will continue so that similar organizations are not formed again. As of 2023, the group is defunct.

Actions and attacks

2012 
The group gained their notoriety and fame after kidnapping, and later killing, two police officers in October 2012. Both police officers were kidnapped and then killed when they were scouting the area for probable terrorist activities. Both of the bodies were found by Indonesian Army search parties that were sent out after both officers were unable to be contacted. During the search operations, Santoso taunted Indonesian military and law enforcement to "fight him like a man" and to "stop looking good on television". The group was known to have prepared traps for Indonesian military search parties. Despite the action of the MIT and the death of the police officers, Indonesian search and rescue attempts were able to corner MIT multiple times.

On 24 October, the group attacked a police kiosk on Poso, Central Sulawesi, injuring four people; two police officers and two civilians.

2014 
One of the perpetrators in the killing of the police officers in 2012 is arrested at Mamasa, West Sulawesi, by Densus 88. During the year, the group allegedly shot at a police station. The police also stated that MIT have participated in the abductions and killings of civilians, some of the killing is allegedly done because the civilian is acting as informant for the security forces.

2015 
During 2015, the terrorist group conduct attacks on Christians, and also involved in shootouts with Indonesian police. One Indonesian soldier and one police officer is killed during the year.

2016 
One Indonesian police officer is killed by MIT during a shootout at Poso, while the two of the terrorists are killed. Indonesian police stated that the terrorist group is operating on a difficult terrain at Pegunungan Biru. Indonesian police claimed that during their operation in 2016 28 members of the terrorist group has been arrested.

2020 
After years of inactivity, the terrorist group struck again in November 2020, killing a Christian family, burning a Christian church, and also set fire to 6 homes. Days after the attack, Indonesian National Police claimed that during the year Detachment 88 have arrested 32 alleged terrorists from East Indonesia Mujahideen.

2021
On May 11, 2021, four farmers were killed by the group in the Napu Valley, Kalimango Village, East Lore Subdistrict, Poso District. The attack was said to be a revenge for the killing of two members of the group, including Santoso's son, two months prior.

Foreign assistance

Uyghurs 
Turkish passports were used by Uyghurs who were seeking to contact Mujahidin Indonesia Timor.

ISIS/ISIL aligned Uyghurs have been traveling to Indonesia to participate in terrorist attacks against Shia, Christians, and the Indonesian government, during a terrorist attack in Central Sulawesi, one Uighur, Farouk, was killed by Indonesian security personnel in November, and another Uighur terrorist, Alli, was arrested for plotting a terrorist attack. China has been contacted by the Indonesian government who sought assistance in confronting Uighur members of terrorist organizations in Indonesia. Indonesia arrested a possible suicide bomber named Ali, a Uyghur, on 24 December 2015.

In Sulawesi on Tuesday 15 March 2016 two pro-ISIS Uyghurs in Indonesia were liquidated by Indonesian government forces. The Indonesians used bullets to kill them. The "Doğu Türkistan Bülteni Haber Ajansı" which supports the Turkistan Islamic Party (TIP), denounced the Indonesian government and police for their killing of 2 Uyghurs who were members of "Doğu Endonezya Mücahitleri" (Mujahidin Indonesia Timor). 2 Uyghurs with suspected terror ties were killed in Sulawesi by Indonesian security forces on 8 April and the killings were condemned by "Doğu Türkistan Bülteni Haber Ajansı". The "Doğu Türkistan Bülteni Haber Ajansı" slammed the Indonesian government for hunting down four Uyghurs who illegally entered the country to join "Doğu Endonezya Mücahitleri" and accused the Indonesian government of attacking Muslims. A Uighur accused of terror ties was killed in Sulawesi by the Indonesian security forces on 24 April, for which the "Doğu Türkistan Bülteni Haber Ajansı" condemned the Indonesian government.

In Poso Uyghurs were being instructed by Santoso, the head of Mujahideen Indonesia Timur. Faruq Magalasi, Mus'ab, Ibrohim, and Joko were the names obtained by the Indonesian media of Uyghurs being hunted by the Indonesian police.

In Poso four Uyghurs were captured by Indonesian police after they allegedly illegally entered Indonesia via Malaysia and Thailand with forged passports.

Death of notable members
On 3 April 2015,  was killed by police. On 18 July 2016, Indonesian soldiers killed MIT leader Santoso during an operation. Sobron was also killed during the Tinombala Operation's Task Force on 19 September 2016. Leader Ali Kalora was killed alongside commander Jaka "Ikrima" Ramadhan on September 18, 2021.

Andika Eka Putra, one of the most wanted members of MIT, died on 14 September 2016. He was found dead on the banks of the Puna in Tangkura village, after accidentally falling while crossing a river, and dying of head injury after hitting a rock.

Members
According to Police commissioner Leo Bona Lubis, before this Santoso group together with his followers numbered 28 people. But it increased to 45 people who were thought to be in the mountain and the forest in Poso Pesisir Bersaudara dan Lore.
  Nae aka Galuh aka Mukhlas (originally Bima)
  Askar aka Jaid aka Pak Guru (from Bima)
  Ahmad Gazali aka Ahmad Panjang (from Poso)
  Suhardin alias Hasan Pranata (from Poso)
  Muhammad Faisal aka Namnung aka Kobar (from Poso)
  Abu Alim aka Ambo (from Bima)
  Taufik Bulaga aka Upik Lawanga (from Poso) - DT
  Alvin aka Adam aka Mus'ab aka Alvin Anshori (from Banten)
  Khairul aka Irul aka Aslam (from Poso)
  Wahid aka Aan aka Bojes (from Poso)
  Azis Arifin aka Azis (from Poso)
  Santoso aka Abu Wardah (from Poso / Java)
  Ali Ahmad aka Ali Kalora (from Poso) 
  Qatar alias Farel aka Anas (from Bima) 
  Sabar Subagyo aka Daeng Koro
  Jaka Ramadan aka Ikrima aka Rama (from Banten)
  Rukli (from Poso)
  Basri aka Bagong (from Poso) – DT
  Jumiatun Muslim (Santoso's wife from Bima) – M
  Syarifudin Thalib aka Udin aka Usman (from Poso) – M
  Firmansyah aka Thoriq aka Imam (from Poso) – M
  Nurmi Usman (Basri's wife from Bima) – DT
  Tini Susanti Kaduka (Ali Kalora's wife from Bima) – DT
  Aditya aka Idad aka Kuasa (from Ambon) – DT
  Basir alias Romzi (from Bima)
  Andi Muhammad aka Abdullah aka Abdurrahman Al Makasari (from Makassar)
  Alqindi Mutaqien aka Muaz (from Banten)
  Alhaji Kaliki aka Ibrohim (from Ambon)
  Firdaus aka Daus aka Baroque aka Rangga (from Bima)
  Kholid (from Poso)
  Ali aka Darwin Gobel (from Poso)
  Muis Fahron aka Abdullah (from Poso)
  Rajif Gandi Sabban aka Rajes (from Ambon)
  Suharyono Hiban aka Yono Sayur
  Word aka Ikrima (from Poso)
  Sucipto aka Cipto Ubaid (from Poso)
  Adji Pandu Suwotomo aka Sobron (from Java)
  Andika Eka Putra aka Hilal (from Poso)
  Yazid aka Taufik (from Java)
  Mukhtar aka Kahar (from Palu)
  Abu Urwah aka Bado aka Osama (from Poso)
  Mamat
  Nanto Bojel
  Can aka Fajar (from Bima)
  Sogir aka Yanto (from Bima)
  Herman aka David (from Bima)
  Busro aka Dan (from Bima)
  Fonda Amar Shalihin aka Dodo (from Java)
  Hamdra Tamil aka Papa Yusran (from Poso)
  Udin aka Rambo (from Malino)
  Germanto aka Rudi
  Anto aka Tiger
  Agus Suryanto Farhan aka Ayun
  Ibrahim (TIP Member)
  Bahtusan Magalazi alias Farouk (TIP Member)
  Nurettin Gundoggdu alias Abd Malik (TIP Member)
  Sadik Torulmaz alias Abdul Aziz (TIP Member)
  Thuram Ismali alias Joko (TIP Member)
  Mustafa Genc alias Mus'ab (TIP Member)
  Samil aka Nunung (from Poso) – DT
  Salman aka Opik (from Bima) – M
  Jumri aka Tamar (from Poso) – M
  Ibadurahman (from Bima) – M
  Syamsul (from Java) – M
  Mochamad Sonhaji (from Java) – M
  Irfan Maulana aka Akil (from Poso) – M

References

2010 establishments in Indonesia
Islamic terrorism in Indonesia
Organizations designated as terrorist by Malaysia
Organisations designated as terrorist by the United Kingdom
Organizations designated as terrorist by the United States